Baddy Doub (English: I Want to Melt Away) is the first studio album by Lebanese singer Elissa. The album was produced by Lido Musique and distributed by Watary music company in early December 1998 in Lebanon, before being picked up by EMI for distribution in the Arab world and elsewhere in February 1999. Elissa filmed a music video for the titular song "Baddy Doub", which achieved huge success in the Arab world. The album was among the best-selling albums in the Arab world throughout 1999 and remained on the charts in the following year. After the album's success, the American company Head & Shoulders signed with Elissa for her first commercial deal, and she advertised the shampoo with her song "Baddy Doub".

The album consisted of eight songs, five of which were foreign tunes the rights to which were purchased, as well as two remixes.

Track listing
All tracks feature vocals by Gerard Ferrer.

Notes
"Baddy Doub" is an Arabic-language cover of the 1996 Turkish song "Be Adam" by Gülşen.
"Waynak Habibi" is an Arabic-language cover of the 1996 Turkish song "Saz mı Caz mı?" by Gülşen.
"Elissa" is an Arabic-language cover of the 1995 Turkish song "Sevme" by Bendeniz.
"Zaalan" is an Arabic-language cover of the 1997 Turkish song "Acilen" by İzel.
"Ghali" is an Arabic-language cover of the 1996 Turkish song "Dert Gecesi" by Serdar Ortaç.

References

Elissa (singer) albums
1998 albums